Liliane Sprécher (20 May 1926 – 2 April 2019) was a French sprinter. She competed in the women's 200 metres at the 1948 Summer Olympics.

References

External links
 

1926 births
2019 deaths
Athletes (track and field) at the 1948 Summer Olympics
French female sprinters
Olympic athletes of France
Place of birth missing
Olympic female sprinters